Lemna valdiviana is a species of duckweed known by the common name Valdivia duckweed. It is native to much of the Americas. It is a minute flowering plant which grows in mats on the surface of calm bodies of freshwater. The individual plant is a flat, translucent, pale green oval body 2 to 4 millimeters long. There is a longitudinal vein visible under magnification and microscopy. The body produces a root which may exceed a centimeter in length, and a tiny, ephemeral flower which is often encapsulated in a membrane. The plant often grows in clusters of two to seven individuals.

References

External links
 Jepson Manual Treatment
 USDA Plants Profile
 Photo Identification Guide and Botanical Characteristics
 Flora of North America
 Photo gallery

Lemnoideae
Freshwater plants
Flora of Chile
Flora of North America